Phanuel Kavita (born 9 March 1993) is a Congolese footballer who plays as a defender for Birmingham Legion in the USL Championship also captaining the team.

Career

College
Kavita spent his entire college career at Clemson University. He started all 81 games during his four-year career with the Tigers and led them to an ACC Tournament title in his senior year.

Professional
On 17 January 2015, Kavita signed a homegrown contract with Real Salt Lake.  On 22 March, he made his professional debut with USL affiliate club Real Monarchs SLC in a 0–0 draw against LA Galaxy II.

On 28 April 2017, Puerto Rico FC announced the signing of Kavita.

On 12 December 2017, Kavita signed with USL side Saint Louis FC.

Following the dissolution of Saint Louis FC, Kavita joined Birmingham Legion on 8 December 2020.

References

External links

Clemson Tigers bio
Puerto Rico FC player profile

1993 births
Living people
Democratic Republic of the Congo footballers
Democratic Republic of the Congo expatriate footballers
Clemson Tigers men's soccer players
Real Salt Lake players
Real Monarchs players
Puerto Rico FC players
Saint Louis FC players
Association football defenders
Expatriate soccer players in the United States
USL Championship players
Major League Soccer players
Soccer players from Utah
Expatriate footballers in Puerto Rico
North American Soccer League players
Homegrown Players (MLS)
Birmingham Legion FC players